Dr. Vallabhbhai Kathiria (born 30 November 1954) is a member of the 14th Lok Sabha of India. He represents the Rajkot constituency of Gujarat and is a member of the Bharatiya Janata Party.He was a minister of state in Vajpayee ministry. Later, Kathiria was heading Gujarat's ‘Gau Seva Ayog’. In 2019, Kathiria was made chairman of Rashtriya Kamdhenu Aayog (RKA), the government body set up under Department of Animal Husbandry and Dairying , Government of India.

Controversies
In 2020,  Vallabhbhai Kathiria claimed that cow is full of science. He also launched a chip made of cow dung claiming that it reduces radiation from mobile phones. He also claimed that 800 corona patients have been cured by panchgavya, an elixir made of cow dung, cow urine, ghee, milk and curd. Scientists said that all these claims are without any scientific backing.

References

External links
 Official biographical sketch in Parliament of India website

Bharatiya Janata Party politicians from Gujarat
Living people
1954 births
India MPs 2004–2009
People from Rajkot
India MPs 1996–1997
India MPs 1998–1999
India MPs 1999–2004
Lok Sabha members from Gujarat